Anton Krupicka (born 2 August 1983) is an American ultra-runner. He has won the Leadville 100 twice, the Miwok 100K, the Rocky Raccoon 100 Miler, the Collegiate Peaks 50 Miler, the White River 50 Miler twice (Set 2010 CR 6:25:29), the High Mountain 50k and the Estes Park Marathon.  He also came in second in the Western States Endurance Run in 2010 in what would have been a course record time of 15:13:53. His surname is pronounced as "crew-pitch-kuh".

Training and personal life
Krupicka is known for his long hair and beard as well as his minimalist approach to life.  He often runs without a shirt and with very lightweight minimal running shoes.  He ran his first marathon when he was twelve years old. During college and in his early 20s he often ran upwards of 200 miles a week. Krupicka is featured in the film Indulgence: 1000 Miles Under The Colorado Sky which chronicles his Summer 2007 training leading up to the Leadville Trail 100.

Krupicka grew up near Niobrara, Nebraska. He used to be a graduate student at the University of Colorado, but dropped out to be a professional runner.  Krupicka earned his BA from Colorado College in 2005, double-majoring in physics and philosophy.  In 2006, he completed a second BA at Colorado College in geology.

Notes

External links
 Anton's Blog
 Running Times Blog
 Feature on Anton in Competitor Magazine
 "How Krupicka Raced the Western States 100" Running Times
 Outdoor Ambassador's Profile
 Backcountry Runner Profile
 Ultimate Direction Signature Series Vest Endorsed By Krupicka
 Café du Cycliste CARAVAN ambassador Anton Krupicka

American male ultramarathon runners
Living people
1983 births
People from Knox County, Nebraska